Chrasť nad Hornádom is a village and municipality in the Spišská Nová Ves District in the Košice Region of central-eastern Slovakia.

Etymology
Chrasť - a dense bush, brushwood (Slovak from Proto-Slavic chvorstь). Horost (1280).

History
In historical records the village was first mentioned in 1280.

Geography
The village lies at an altitude of 420 metres and covers an area of 9.387 km².
In 2011 had a population of 840 people.

Genealogical resources

The records for genealogical research are available at the state archive "Statny Archiv in Levoca, Slovakia"

 Roman Catholic church records (births/marriages/deaths): 1713-1897 (parish A)

See also
 List of municipalities and towns in Slovakia

References

External links
http://en.e-obce.sk/obec/chrastnadhornadom/chrast-nad-hornadom.html
http://www.chrastnadhornadom.ocu.sk
https://web.archive.org/web/20080111223415/http://www.statistics.sk/mosmis/eng/run.html 
Surnames of living people in Chrast nad Hornadom

Villages and municipalities in Spišská Nová Ves District